The FIL European Luge Championships 1977 took place in Königssee, West Germany for a record fourth time after hosting the event previously in 1967, 1972, and 1973.

Men's singles

Women's singles

Men's doubles

Medal table

References
Men's doubles European champions
Men's singles European champions
Women's singles European champions

FIL European Luge Championships
1977 in luge
Luge in Germany
1977 in German sport